Cohors II Italica Civium Romanorum was a Roman cohort from Italia formed from Roman citizens.

According to Josephus, the principal portion of the Roman army stationed at Caesarea were Syrians. and the Pulpit Commentary therefore considers it 'pretty certain ... that the Italian cohort here spoken of were auxiliaries, so called as being made up in whole or in part of Italians, probably volunteers or velones.'

The cohort was among those stationed in Syria in 157 under legate Arridius Cornelianus.

Notes

Further reading
W. M. Ramsay. Cornelius and the Italic Cohort, The Expositor, 1896

Infantry units and formations of ancient Rome
Judea (Roman province)